Mats Bertil Åhlberg (born 16 May 1947) is a retired Swedish professional ice hockey player who played in the Elitserien. He played for Leksands IF, and with 323 goals in 491 matches remains the top goalscorer for that club. He won the Swedish national title with Leksands in 1969 and 1973–75.

He competed as a member of the Sweden men's national ice hockey team at the 1972 and 1980 Winter Olympics where he won the bronze medal. He was also a member of the Swedish 1976 Canada Cup team. In 1972, he played two matches and scored one goal. In 1980, he was Sweden's most productive player, with six goals and four assists. In total Åhlberg played 73 matches in international tournaments and scored 38 goals.

References

External links
 

1947 births
Living people
Ice hockey players at the 1972 Winter Olympics
Ice hockey players at the 1980 Winter Olympics
Leksands IF players
Olympic bronze medalists for Sweden
Olympic ice hockey players of Sweden
Olympic medalists in ice hockey
People from Avesta Municipality
Swedish ice hockey centres
Medalists at the 1980 Winter Olympics
Sportspeople from Dalarna County